The Foday Explorer is a series of compact and midsize SUVs manufactured since 2002 by Foday. The Explorer SUV series was developed based on the platform of the Mitsubishi Pajero  with designs heavily inspired by the first and second-generation Isuzu D-Max and Chevrolet Colorado. Due to Foday Explorer's business in automotive parts and stampings, the vehicle bodies of the Foday Explorer were also sold to several manufacturers as rebadged pickups and SUVs.

Foday Explorer I/ Foday Explorer II/ Foday Explorer III

The Foday Explorer I gasoline-powered "Luxury Trim" was launched in January 2002 with a price of 83,800 yuan. It is available as a 7-seater configuration and is equipped with a manual transmission and a rear wheel drive powertrain.

In January 2003 an additional "Ultra Luxury trim" was launched with a price of 91,800 yuan. An additional 2.2-litre naturally aspirated inline-4 engine option was added in 2004 codenamed "NHQ6480E". As of 2006, a 2.8-litre Turbo Diesel inline-4 engine was added and was mated to a 5-speed manual transmission.

The Foday Explorer II was launched in 2005, and was developed with the cooperation of The Hong Kong Polytechnic University as an updated version of the Explorer I. The engine is a 2.2-litre inline-4 engine developing  mated to a 5-speed manual transmission.

In February 2006, the Explorer III was launched. The Explorer III is equipped with a JX493QZ3 Isuzu-sourced turbo diesel engine while still being built on the Mitsubishi-sourced platform.

Foday Explorer 6

A major facelift was conducted for the Foday Explorer series called the Explorer 6, changing the design of the front and rear of the SUV massively, with the platform still being based on the Mitsubishi design.

Powertrain
The entry level Explorer 6 is powered by a 2.0-litre,  petrol engine and a price tag of 89,800 yuan.

Golden Dragon Righto V3
The Golden Dragon Righto V3 (锐度) SUV is a rebadged version of the Foday Explorer 6 produced by Golden Dragon. The Righto V3 debuted in May 2013 on a bus show in Fuzhou, Fujian Province. The Chinese name of the Righto V3 is Ruidu V3. The manufacturer, Golden Dragon or Xiamen Golden Dragon Bus is from Xiamen in Fujian Province, and is a subsidiary of King Long United Automotive Industry Corporation from Xiamen.

Golden Dragon and Foday have a license-agreement for the Righto V3 with Foday producing the base-car with chassis and bodywork, and shipping it to Golden Dragon for final assembly. Engine of the Righto V3 is a  2.0-litre petrol engine and the same  2.8-litre diesel engine shared by the Foday Explorer 6. Gearbox of the Righto V3 is a 5-speed manual transmission.

References 

Cars of China
Compact sport utility vehicles
Mid-size sport utility vehicles
Rear-wheel-drive vehicles
All-wheel-drive vehicles
Cars introduced in 2002